Fritz Wendhausen(7 August 1890, Wendhausen – 5 January 1962, Königstein im Taunus) was a German actor, screenwriter and film director. He is also credited as Frederick Wendhausen and F.R. Wendhausen. In 1938 he emigrated to Britain from Nazi Germany.

Selected filmography
Screenwriter
 The Grand Duke's Finances (1924)
 The Trial of Donald Westhof (1927)
 Dreyfus (1930)
 1914 (1931)
 The Marriage Swindler (1938)

Actor
 Old Heidelberg (1923)
 Secret Mission (1942)
 Tomorrow We Live (1943)
 Beware of Pity (1946)
 Odette (1950)
 Desperate Moment (1953)
 Orders to Kill (1958)

Director
 The Eternal Curse (1921)
 Madame de La Pommeraye's Intrigues (1922)
 The Stone Rider (1923)
 The Director General (1925)
 His Toughest Case (1926)
 The Trial of Donald Westhof (1927)
 Out of the Mist (1927)
 A Woman with Style (1928)
 The Runaway Princess (1929)
 Queen of the Night (1931)
 The First Right of the Child (1932)
 Little Man, What Now? (1933)
 The Black Whale (1934)
 Peer Gynt (1934)
 Artist Love (1935)
 Family Parade (1936)

References

External links
 

1890 births
1962 deaths
People from Hochtaunuskreis
German male film actors
Film people from Hesse
20th-century German male actors
German male writers
Commanders Crosses of the Order of Merit of the Federal Republic of Germany
People who emigrated to escape Nazism